The 1932 Richmond Spiders football team was an American football team that represented the University of Richmond as a member of the Virginia Conference during the 1932 college football season. In their 19th season under head coach Frank Dobson, Richmond compiled a 4–2–2 record and finished as Virginia champion.

Schedule

References

Richmond
Richmond Spiders football seasons
Richmond Spiders football